Ikot Ibritam is a rural settlement as well as the local government headquarters of the Oruk Anam local government area. It is under the Inen Clan  as the one among the nine administrative areas in the Oruk Anam

History 

Ikot Ibritam is popularly known among the local government council headquarters and as well as one of the administrative centers in Akwa Ibom State, 
Nigeria and a seat of a first-order administrative
division in the Oruk Anam LGA. neared Ukanafun and a part in Rivers State.

Localities in the area 
Ikot Ekpuk
Ikot Udor Esiom
Ikot Ntuk
Ikot Aka 5 km northwest 
Ikot Esien 5 km north 
Ibesit Nung Ikot 5 km south.

References

External links 

Towns in Oruk Anam
Populated places in Akwa Ibom State